Al Doughty (born Alan Jaworski, 31 January 1966) is an English musician and bassist. He is primarily known for being a member since 1988 of the alternative rock band Jesus Jones, in which he continues to be active, as of 2021.

Career 
Originally the bassist for the London based rock band Jesus Jones, Doughty later became the bassist for Jon Langford's band Skull Orchard, the Waco Brothers, and Dean Schlabowske's band Dollar Store. Of his unorthodox bass style, Doughty said, "It's all nervous energy. I really have no idea where I'm going next with something. I don't know anything about theory. It's all new to me every time I play".

Personal life 
Doughty attended Beechen Cliff School in Bath, Somerset, England between 1977 and 1982. He is currently based in the suburbs of Chicago, Illinois, United States with his wife.

References

1966 births
English bass guitarists
English male guitarists
Male bass guitarists
Living people
People educated at City of Bath Boys' School
Musicians from Plymouth, Devon